The South Australian Railways Gd Class locomotives were built by Beyer, Peacock and Company for service on the Holdfast Bay railway line in 1880. They were numbered 4 and 5. In November 1881, both engines were sold to the Glenelg Railway Company and became their number 9 and 10. These locomotives entered service on the South Australian Railways in December 1899, following their purchase of the Glenelg Railway Company and thus classed Gd No. 163 and 164. Nos. 163 and 164 were both condemned as of the 6th of February 1925 and ultimately scrapped.

References	

	

	
Gd	
Broad gauge locomotives in Australia	
Beyer, Peacock locomotives	
0-4-4T locomotives	
Railway locomotives introduced in 1880
 	

Passenger locomotives 
Scrapped locomotives